Raffaele Marcoli (27 March 1940 in Turbigo, Italy– 29 August 1966 in Feriolo, Italy) was an Italian professional road bicycle racer. He won 4 stages at the Giro d'Italia in 1963, 1964, 1965 and 1966. He also won the semi-classic race Coppa Bernocchi and Tirreno–Adriatico. He died with his girlfriend in a traffic collision accident on August 29, 1966, aged 26.

Major results 

1962
Gran Premio Somma
Coppa d'Inverno
1963
Milan-Vignola
2nd
1964
Giro d'Italia
Winner 11th stage
1965
Giro d'Italia
Winner 12th and 17th stage
1966
Coppa Bernocchi
Giro d'Italia
Winner 6th stage
Tirreno–Adriatico
Winner 3rd stage

References 

1940 births
1966 deaths
Italian male cyclists
Road incident deaths in Italy
Cyclists from the Metropolitan City of Milan